The MS Charming (formerly Sea Princess and Adonia) is a   formerly operated by Princess Cruises.

History 
The vessel was delivered to Princess Cruises from Fincantieri and began operation in 1998 under the name of Sea Princess.

Sea Princess was transferred to P&O Cruises in late 2002/early 2003. P&O renamed her Adonia on 21 May 2003 (not to be confused with a different P&O vessel of a different class which was also given the Adonia name later in 2011). The Princess Royal and her daughter Zara Phillips renamed the vessel to Adonia at a launching ceremony with sister ship Oceana, in the first double ship naming ceremony ever in the UK. Adonia filled the gap left in the P&O Cruises fleet in the period between Arcadia leaving the fleet to become Ocean Village and the launch of the new Arcadia in 2005, when the vessel was transferred back to Princess Cruises.

When Princess Cruises reacquired her in 2005, the vessel was once more named Sea Princess, in a ceremony by Joanna Lumley.

As of 2019, Sea Princess was homeported in Australia and was intended to sail from new homeports in Fremantle and Adelaide for the 2020–2021 calendar season. However, in September 2020 Princess Cruises announced that it had sold the Sea Princess to undisclosed buyers. On 13 November 2020 Sea Princess was officially handed over to Sanya International Cruise Development and renamed Charming. In early 2021, the ship was drydocked at China Merchants Industry Holding Co shipyard, Mazhou Island.

Accidents and incidents

Norovirus outbreaks
At the end of May 2006, 250 people, including 18 crew, were affected by a norovirus. Evidence of a gastrointestinal virus had been found during the last two days of the previous cruise, but the company stated that it did not believe the two outbreaks to be linked. The passengers were notified of this occurrence by a letter found in their cabins after boarding. Although the ship's itinerary had been altered, and the vessel ordered to dock away from other vessels, no other countermeasures were effected. Sea Princess returned to port in Southampton a day early, and the vessel underwent a complete sanitisation and decontamination before resuming cruising. Passengers were offered a 30% refund and a £150 voucher for use on a later Princess cruise; some demanded a full refund.  A norovirus outbreak occurred again on the following cruise, although to a lesser extent, and visible precautions included waiter service at the buffets and the absence of salt and pepper shakers. This cruise was also affected by force 11-12 winds in the vicinity of Ushant, causing the first scheduled port to be missed, while the remaining itinerary remained unaltered. The ship was undamaged, the nearby  suffered broken windows, and  terminated her Spain-bound voyage in France due to storm damage. It is likely that the rough seas caused increased use of the handrails, contributing to the difficulty of eradicating norovirus.

In January 2018, about 200 passengers were reported to have been infected with norovirus during a two-week round trip from Brisbane to New Zealand.

Drug smuggling 
On 28 August 2016, three Canadian nationals were arrested after Sea Princess berthed in Sydney Harbour. After the ship docked Australian Border Force officers along with drug sniffing dogs boarded the ship. During a search of the ship  of cocaine was found packed in suitcases. The estimated value of the cocaine is $30 million AUD ($22 million USD). The maximum penalty for this offense is life in prison.

Gallery

References

External links 

 www.princess.com – Princess Cruises site
 Video clip of M.V. Sea Princess

Ships of Princess Cruises
1998 ships
Ships built by Fincantieri
Maritime incidents in 2006
Ships of P&O Cruises